Richard Donald Marles (born 13 July 1967) is an Australian politician who has been deputy prime minister of Australia and Minister for Defence in the Albanese government since 2022. He has been deputy leader of the Australian Labor Party (ALP) since 2019.

Marles grew up in Geelong, Victoria, and is a lawyer by profession. He was assistant secretary of the Australian Council of Trade Unions (ACTU) from 2000 to 2007. He was elected to the House of Representatives at the 2007 federal election, after defeating incumbent Labor MP Gavan O'Connor for preselection in the seat of Corio. Marles was made a parliamentary secretary in 2009 and briefly served as Minister for Trade in 2013, having supported Kevin Rudd's return as prime minister. He was appointed to shadow cabinet after the ALP's defeat at the 2013 election and became a senior figure in the Labor Right faction. Marles was elected deputy leader to Anthony Albanese after the 2019 election, becoming deputy opposition leader. He became deputy prime minister following the ALP's victory at the 2022 election.

Early life
Marles was born on 13 July 1967 in Geelong, Victoria. He is the son of Donald Marles OAM, a former headmaster of Trinity Grammar School, and Fay Marles AM (née Pearce), Victoria's first Equal Opportunity Commissioner and later Chancellor of the University of Melbourne.

Marles was educated at Geelong Grammar School and the University of Melbourne where he resided at Ormond College. He graduated with a Bachelor of Science and Bachelor of Laws with Honours. He joined the Melbourne University Labor Club in his first week at university and served as president of the Melbourne University Student Union in 1988. He was also the General Secretary of the National Union of Students in 1989. He started his career as a solicitor with Melbourne industrial law firm Slater and Gordon. In 1994, he became legal officer for the Transport Workers Union (TWU). He was elected TWU National Assistant Secretary four years later. In 2000 he joined Australia's peak national union body, the Australian Council of Trade Unions (ACTU), as assistant secretary, remaining in the position until 2007.

Politics

Early career
In March 2006, Marles nominated for Labor preselection against the sitting member for Corio, Gavan O'Connor, as part of a challenge to several sitting members organised by the right-wing Labor Unity faction of the party. In the local ballot Marles polled 57% of the vote, and his endorsement was then confirmed by the party's public office selection committee.

Marles was elected member for Corio on 24 November 2007 in the election that returned the Labor Party to office under the leadership of Kevin Rudd.  From February 2008 to June 2009 he was chair of the House of Representatives Standing Committee on Aboriginal and Torres Strait Islander Affairs.

Parliamentary secretary and Minister for Trade

In June 2009 Marles was appointed Parliamentary Secretary for Innovation and Industry. He retained his seat in the 2010 election and was sworn in as Parliamentary Secretary for Pacific Island Affairs in the First Gillard Ministry on 14 September 2010. In July 2011, Marles became the first Australian member of parliament to visit Wallis and Futuna. Marles arrived in Wallis and Futuna to attend a ceremony with King Kapiliele Faupala in Mata-Utu marking the 50th anniversary of the islands' status as a French Overseas collectivity. Marles had previously visited New Caledonia in October 2010 and French Polynesia in March 2011.

In the ministerial reshuffle of 2 March 2012, Marles was given the additional role of Parliamentary Secretary for Foreign Affairs. On 21 March 2013 he resigned these roles after expressing support for Kevin Rudd to challenge Julia Gillard for the leadership; a challenge that did not eventuate.

In June 2013, he was appointed the Minister for Trade and a member of the Cabinet, succeeding Craig Emerson, who resigned following the June 2013 leadership spill that saw Kevin Rudd defeat Julia Gillard for leadership of the Labor Party.

Shadow minister
After the ALP's defeat at the 2013 federal election, Marles was appointed Shadow Minister for Immigration and Border Protection under opposition leader Bill Shorten. In February 2016, he began co-hosting the weekly television program Pyne & Marles on Sky News Live with Liberal MP Christopher Pyne. Marles had his portfolio changed after the 2016 election, becoming Shadow Minister for Defence. He has been cited as holding pro-U.S. views and as "somewhat of a hawk".

Deputy Leader of the Opposition
In May 2019, after Labor lost the 2019 federal election, it was reported that Marles would stand for the deputy leadership of the party, and would likely be elected unopposed following Clare O'Neil's decision not to run. He was formally endorsed as deputy to Anthony Albanese on 30 May, and selected the portfolio of Defence in the shadow cabinet.

Following a shadow cabinet reshuffle in January 2021, Marles was placed in charge of a new "super portfolio" relating to recovery from the COVID-19 pandemic, encompassing a "broad brief across national reconstruction, jobs, skills, small business and science".

Deputy Prime Minister
Two days after the 2022 federal election, Albanese had himself, Marles and three other senior Labor frontbenchers sworn in as an interim five-person government. Although counting was still underway, it was apparent by this time that no other party could realistically form even a minority government. The transfer of power was expedited due to the upcoming Quadrilateral Security Dialogue, with the full ministry due to be sworn in after the Quad. As Albanese flew to Tokyo to take part in the Quad soon after being sworn in, Marles served as Acting Prime Minister until Albanese returned to lead the nation full-time. He continues to return to the role whenever Albanese leaves the country.

Political positions
Marles is a senior figure in his state's Labor Right faction.

Refugees and asylum seekers
Marles supports the turning back of asylum seekers who arrive in Australia by boat and a Pacific Solution for the resettlement of refugees.

Marles was supportive of an Australian War Memorial commemorating Operation Sovereign Borders navy personnel who undertook activities to stop asylum seekers coming to Australia by boat. That position was criticised by several Labor Left MPs as well as the Greens.

Population
Marles supports higher Population growth.

National defence

In 2020, as shadow defence minister, Marles was critical of the Morrison government's handling of the programme to purchase French submarines, which, he said, had "profoundly compromised" Australia's national security. Marles otherwise supported the bipartisan consensus on national defence matters.

Fossil fuels and energy 
On an interview on Sky News on 20 February 2019, Marles stated that it would be "a good thing" if the thermal coal market in Australia collapsed. He later back-tracked on this statement, saying that his "attack on coal was tone-deaf".

Following the 2019 Federal Election, Marles maintained that public funds should not be used to subsidise coal, saying "a Labor government is not going to put a cent into subsidising coal-fired power", and the market should be allowed to make its own decisions, while also saying that if a private company decided to push forward with a mine and gained the necessary approvals that Labor would not stand in its way.

Personal life
Marles lives in Geelong with his wife Rachel Schutze. He has three children from his current marriage and one from his first marriage to Lisa Neville, who was elected to the Victorian Legislative Assembly in 2002 and later became a state minister.

Marles is a supporter and member of the Geelong Football Club.

References
Notes

Footnotes

External links

 Richard Marles' website
 

|-

|-

 

1967 births
20th-century Australian lawyers
Australian trade unionists
People educated at Geelong Grammar School
Politicians from Geelong
Living people
Members of the Cabinet of Australia
Members of the Australian House of Representatives for Corio
Members of the Australian House of Representatives
University of Melbourne alumni
Australian Labor Party members of the Parliament of Australia
Labor Right politicians
Sky News Australia reporters and presenters
21st-century Australian politicians
Government ministers of Australia
21st-century Australian lawyers